Steven Eric Tovar (born April 25, 1970) is a former college and professional American football linebacker and a former football coach at the University of Kansas.

College career
Tovar played for the Ohio State University Buckeyes from 1989 to 1992. Tovar was the first of 21 players recruited by Ohio State head coach John Cooper to earn All-America status at Ohio State. He led Ohio State in tackles for three-consecutive seasons between 1990 and 1992, and currently ranks fourth in school history with 414 total tackles and 239 solo tackles.  In his senior year Tovar was named Big Ten Defensive Player of the Year (selected by the conference coaches) after recording 128 tackles. He was three-time All-Big Ten selection, and a two-time American Football Coaches Association All-America selection.  As a senior, Tovar was elected team co-captain (along with quarterback Kirk Herbstreit).

Tovar was inducted into the Ohio State Varsity O Hall of Fame in 2001.

Professional career
Tovar was a third round selection by the Cincinnati Bengals in the 1993 NFL Draft.  He had an eight-year career in the National Football League, including five years with the Bengals, two with the San Diego Chargers, and one with the Carolina Panthers.

Coaching
Tovar spent the 2004 and 2005 football seasons with the Army Black Knights, coaching linebackers under head coach Bobby Ross.  He then joined the Miami Dolphins staff, under coach Nick Saban. In 2007, Tovar joined the coaching staff of University of Kansas Jayhawks under Mark Mangino as linebackers coach. Following the 2008 season, Tovar was replaced at Kansas by Louisville's Bill Miller.

Further reading

1970 births
Living people
American football linebackers
Ohio State Buckeyes football players
Ohio State University alumni
People from Elyria, Ohio
Cincinnati Bengals players
San Diego Chargers players
Carolina Panthers players